Sannie Louise Overly (born July 2, 1966) is an American lawyer, engineer, and politician. A member of the Democratic Party, Overly served in the Kentucky House of Representatives, representing the 72nd district. She was the Democratic caucus chair from 2013 to 2017 (fifth-ranking in the majority), and is the first woman to serve in a leadership role in the Kentucky House. She was the Democratic Party nominee for lieutenant governor of Kentucky in 2015, and was elected chair of the Kentucky Democratic Party in 2016.

Early life and education
Overly was born in Millersburg, Kentucky, and graduated from Bourbon County High School. Overly graduated from the University of Kentucky College of Engineering with a Bachelor of Science in civil engineering in 1989, and the University of Louisville School of Law with a Juris Doctor in 1993.

Career 
Overly served as president of the Bourbon County Bar Association and of the Paris–Bourbon County Historic Society. She worked as an engineer for the Kentucky Transportation Cabinet.

Overly ran in a special election to the Kentucky House of Representatives to succeed Carolyn Belcher as representative of the 72nd district. She won the election on January 8, 2008, and was sworn in on January 11. In 2009, Greg Stumbo, the speaker of the Kentucky House, appointed Overly to chair the Budget Review Subcommittee, which has oversight over the state's roads. She became the first woman to chair the budget subcommittee. At the start of the 2013 session, Overly was elected caucus chair by her Democratic House colleagues, who chose her over incumbent chair Robert Damron, making her the first woman to hold a leadership position in the Kentucky House.

Overly had considered running in the 2014 election against Republican Andy Barr to represent  in the United States House of Representatives. However, she instead ran for lieutenant governor of Kentucky on a ticket with Jack Conway in the 2015 gubernatorial election. Conway and Overly lost the election to Matt Bevin and his running mate, Jenean Hampton.

In 2016, Overly was elected as the chair of the Kentucky Democratic Party. She opted not to seek reelection to the Kentucky House in 2018.

Personal life
Overly and her husband, Michael Kalinyak, live in Paris, Kentucky, and have two daughters. Sannie Overly grew up on a farm in Millersburg, Kentucky. She is involved in local cooperatives in her District. Overly is Friends of the Paris-Bourbon Co Library. Bourbon Co Alumni Assoc. UK Alumni Assoc. Paris-Bourbon Co Chamber of Commerce. Bourbon Co Homemakers. DAR, Jemima Johnson Chapter. Bluegrass Conservancy.

References

External links

1966 births
21st-century American engineers
21st-century American politicians
21st-century American women politicians
Engineers from Kentucky
Kentucky lawyers
Kentucky women engineers
Kentucky women in law
Living people
Democratic Party members of the Kentucky House of Representatives
People from Paris, Kentucky
State political party chairs of Kentucky
University of Kentucky College of Engineering alumni
University of Louisville School of Law alumni
Women state legislators in Kentucky